The 1955 Air Force Falcons football team represented the United States Air Force Academy as an independent during the 1955 college football season. The Falcons did not have an official stadium during the season, and remained without one until the 1962 season when Falcon Stadium opened. They were led by first-year head coach Robert V. Whitlow and played the first season for the Air Force falcons football program. The Falcons played only freshmen teams of other schools. Air Force finished with a record of 4–4.

Schedule

References

Air Force
Air Force Falcons football seasons
Air Force Falcons football